Leslie Fred Batty (30 September 1887 – 20 September 1930) was an Australian rules footballer who played with Geelong and Carlton in the Victorian Football League (VFL).

Notes

External links 

Les Batty's profile at Blueseum
 

1887 births
1930 deaths
Australian rules footballers from Victoria (Australia)
Geelong Football Club players
Carlton Football Club players
East Geelong Football Club players